Hanumant Dolas (1 June 1962 - 30 April 2019) Was an Indian politician from Nationalist Congress Party and 2 times Member of Maharashtra Legislative Assembly From Malshiras. He was the chairman of state-run Sant Rohidas Leather Industries and Charmakar Development Corporation Limited. Later, he was also appointed as the director of Maharashtra Housing and Area Development Authority.

References 

1962 births
2019 deaths
Maharashtra MLAs 2004–2009
People from Solapur district
Marathi politicians
Nationalist Congress Party politicians from Maharashtra